Hugh David Poole (6 September 1924 – 3 June 2012) was a New Zealand sailor. He competed in the Soling at the 1976 Summer Olympics, and was a five-time winner of the Sanders Memorial Cup.

References

External links
 

1924 births
2012 deaths
New Zealand male sailors (sport)
Olympic sailors of New Zealand
Sportspeople from Lower Hutt
Sailors at the 1976 Summer Olympics – Soling